Boudreaux Campbell (born August 15, 1998) is an American professional rodeo cowboy who specializes in bull riding. He competes in the Professional Bull Riders (PBR) circuit. He also competed in the Professional Rodeo Cowboys Association (PRCA), as well as in the now-defunct Championship Bull Riding (CBR) organization.

Early and personal life
Campbell is from Crockett, Texas. He was 4 years old when he start mutton busting. He participated in high school rodeo. He won the Texas junior and high school state bull riding championships. He enjoys heeling as a team roper.

Career
Campbell qualified for the CBR World Finals in 2017 and in its last year in 2018. He was the 2017 PRCA Bull Riding Rookie of the Year and qualified for the PRCA's National Finals Rodeo from 2017 to 2021. He was also the 2020 PRCA Xtreme Bulls tour champion. In 2020, Campbell qualified for the PBR World Finals and scored the most points at the event, clinching both the PBR World Finals event average and the 2020 PBR Rookie of the Year title. He won the 2021 PBR Velocity Tour Finals event and again qualified for the PBR World Finals that year. 

The day after the conclusion of the 2022 PBR World Finals, the inaugural PBR Team Series draft was held at Texas Live! in Arlington, Texas. Campbell was selected to ride for the Carolina Cowboys. The  Cowboys won the fifth event of the 2022 PBR Team Series season at Gambler Days in Austin, Texas; the hometown event of rival team, the Austin Gamblers. The Cowboys were eliminated after the second day of the Team Series Championship at T-Mobile Arena in Las Vegas, Nevada and ended up finishing in sixth place at the conclusion of the inaugural PBR Team Series season.

References

1998 births
Living people
Sportspeople from Texas
People from Crockett, Texas
Bull riders